Leonard Whitten  was the Anglican Bishop of Newfoundland and Labrador, Canada from 1997 to 2004.

Educated at the Memorial University of Newfoundland and ordained in 1962 he had previously served at Channel - Port aux Basques, Labrador, Gander Bay and Corner Brook.

References

1937 births
Memorial University of Newfoundland alumni
Anglican bishops of Western Newfoundland
21st-century Anglican Church of Canada bishops
Living people